Giambelli is an Italian surname. Notable people with the surname include:

Federigo Giambelli, Italian military and civil engineer
Giovanni Giambelli (1879–1935), Italian mathematician
Miguel Maria Giambelli (1920–2010), Brazilian Roman Catholic bishop
Valentino Giambelli (born 1928), Italian footballer and businessman

Italian-language surnames